Jonas Björkman and Javier Frana was the defending champions but did not compete that year.

Sandon Stolle and Cyril Suk won in the final 7–6, 6–3 against Karol Kučera and Ján Krošlák.

Seeds
Champion seeds are indicated in bold text while text in italics indicates the round in which those seeds were eliminated.

 Libor Pimek /  Byron Talbot (first round)
 Sandon Stolle /  Cyril Suk (champions)
 Menno Oosting /  Pavel Vízner (first round)
 Jiří Novák /  David Rikl (first round)

Draw

References
 1996 IPB Czech Indoor Doubles Draw

1996 Doubles
Czech Indoor,Doubles